The 3rd Lo Nuestro Awards ceremony, presented by Univision honoring the best Latin music of 1990 and 1991 took place on May 23, 1991, at a live presentation held at the James L. Knight Center in Miami, Florida. The ceremony was broadcast in the United States and Latin America by Univision.

During the ceremony, seventeen categories were presented. Winners were announced at the live event and included Mexican singer-songwriter Ana Gabriel and Dominican group Juan Luis Guerra y 440, receiving three competitive awards each. Mexican band Bronco earned two accolades. The live show included performances by Daniela Romo, Myriam Hernández, Raúl di Blasio, Rudy La Scala, Franco de Vita, Luis Enrique, Banda Blanca, Los Tigres del Norte, Orquesta de la Luz, Azúcar Moreno, Yuri, and Mariachi Cobre.

Background 
In 1989, the Lo Nuestro Awards were established by Univision, to recognize the most talented performers of Latin music. The nominees and winners were selected by a voting poll conducted among program directors of Spanish-language radio stations in the United States and also based on chart performance on Billboard Latin music charts, with the results being tabulated and certified by the accounting firm Deloitte. The trophy awarded is shaped like a treble clef. The categories were for the Pop, Tropical/Salsa, Regional Mexican genres and Music Video fields. The 3rd Lo Nuestro Awards ceremony was held on May 23, 1991, in a live presentation held at the James L. Knight Center in Miami, Florida. The ceremony was broadcast in the United States and Latin America by Univision and included live performances by Daniela Romo, Ana Gabriel, Myriam Hernández, Raúl di Blasio, Rudy La Scala, Franco de Vita, Luis Enrique, Banda Blanca, Los Tigres del Norte, Orquesta de la Luz, Azúcar Moreno, Yuri, and Mariachi Cobre.

Winners and nominees 

Winners were announced before the live audience during the ceremony. Mexican singer-songwriter Ana Gabriel was the most nominated performer and won three of her nominations, including Pop Song of the Year for "Es Demasiado Tarde" (Gabriel was a double nominee in the category). The track was named the best-performing Latin single of 1991 in the United States. Dominican band Juan Luis Guerra y 440 were triple nominees for Tropical Salsa Song of the Year winning for "Burbujas de Amor", Group of the Year and Music Video. Mexican band Bronco dominated the Regional/Mexican field winning Album and Song of the Year with "Corazón Duro". Mexican singer-songwriter Juan Gabriel and Spanish opera singer Plácido Domingo received Lifetime Achievement Awards.

See also
1990 in Latin music
1991 in Latin music
Grammy Award for Best Latin Pop Album

References

1991 music awards
Lo Nuestro Awards by year
1991 in Florida
1991 in Latin music
1990s in Miami